Acquavella is an Italian surname. Notable people with the surname include:

 Nicholas Acquavella (1898–1987), Italian-born American art dealer and gallerist
 William Acquavella (born 1937/38), American art dealer and gallerist

Italian-language surnames